The Ferring Rife is a stream in West Sussex, England that rises in the West Durrington area of Worthing.  It has multiple sources including one near Castle Goring and another in Titnore Wood.  The streams converge that make up the Ferring Rife converge north of Littlehampton Road, passing through Maybridge, then west of Ferring into the sea. It flows south-west, west and then south into the English Channel, between the villages of Ferring and East Preston.

Etymology
The word 'rife' is a Sussex dialect word for a stream, especially between Selsey and Worthing.

See also
 Teville Stream
 List of rivers of England

References

Worthing
Rivers of West Sussex